"Cyclone" is the second single by American rapper Baby Bash from his album Cyclone. The song features T-Pain on the last verse and Mickaël Zibi on the intro and chorus though he is only credited on the album. The song was produced by Lil Jon and the song's beat structure incorporates typical Southern hip hop claps and pizzicatos, as well as Lil Jon's signature crunk synths and whistles. The Recording Industry Association of America certified the song as double platinum. The song peaked at number 7 on the Billboard Hot 100.

Music video
The "Cyclone" video was directed by Malcolm Jones. It premiered on August 6, 2007 on Yahoo! Music. The music video takes place in a strip club.

Remix
On November 26, the official remix was made and it features T-Pain, Hurricane Chris and Gorilla Zoe.

Chart performance
On the Billboard Hot 100, the song debuted at number 65 on the issue dated August 11, 2007. It reached the top 40 at number 33 on September 15, 2007, and peaked at number 7 on November 3, 2007, for two weeks.

Chart positions

Weekly charts

Year-end charts

Certifications

References

2007 songs
2007 singles
Baby Bash songs
T-Pain songs
Songs written by T-Pain
Songs written by Lil Jon
Songs written by Craig Love
Song recordings produced by Lil Jon
Arista Records singles
Crunk songs
Songs written by Baby Bash